The World Mind Sports Games (WMSG) was a multi-sport event created by the International Mind Sports Association (IMSA) as a "stepping stone on the path of introducing a third kind of Olympic Games" after the Summer and the Winter Olympics". 

The inaugural 2008 World Mind Sports Games were held in Beijing from October 3 to 18, about two months after the Summer Olympics and one month after the Paralympics. Five mind sports participated in the first Games: bridge, chess, draughts (checkers), go (weiqi), and xiangqi (Chinese chess). Thirty-five gold medals were contested by 2,763 competitors from 143 countries, using the Olympic Village in Beijing.

The sophomore 2012 World Mind Sports Games were held in Lille, France, from August 9 to August 23, 2012, with 30 events. It starting during the 2012 Summer Olympics held in London, England, and ended shortly before the 2012 Summer Paralympics. At the closing ceremony of the 2012 games, Rio de Janeiro was announced as hosts for the 2016 event, but that did not happen and no further games have been held.

Sports
At the first two WMSG events, medals were contested in five different mind sports: bridge, chess, draughts (checkers), go (weiqi), and xiangqi (Chinese chess). The International Federation of Poker (IFP) is an observer member of IMSA, so poker has been mentioned as a possible future sport at the WMSG. Mathematical games are also planned to be present at 2012 WMSG, in the form of a contest between national teams. The Mahjong International League was accepted as the sixth member of IMSA in 2017.

 Provisional

Continuing competitions
More than half of the 2008 participants were bridge players, partly because the World Bridge Federation transferred some important quadrennial competitions to the WMSG, especially the Open and Women flights of its World Team Olympiad. In 2004 there had been in the main continuing events 72 Open and 43 Women "Olympiad" entries (national  with six players on most squads). Under the Minds Sports rubric in Beijing there were 71 and 54 entries, about 700 players. The one-time, similar tournament with a 28 years age limit attracted another 400 players.

See also 
 Mind sport
 Mind Sports Olympiad
 SportAccord World Mind Games
 World Team Olympiad
 World Bridge Games

Notes

References

External links 

 
Multi-sport events
Mind sports competitions
Contract bridge world competitions
Chess competitions